The Confederate Monument in Frankfort is placed within a circle of the graves of 68 Confederate soldiers in Frankfort Cemetery in Kentucky. The statue depicts a life size Confederate soldier standing ready, carved from white Carrara marble and standing atop a granite pedestal on a limestone base. A flagpole displays the first flag of the Confederacy with seven stars. The monument was erected by Daughters of the Confederacy and unveiled in 1892.

In 1997, the monument was placed on the National Register of Historic Places as one of 60 Civil War monuments in Kentucky. Frankfort has one other, the Colored Soldiers Monument which is located in Green Hill Cemetery.

Inscriptions
The granite pedestal has an inscription on each of its four sides; the fourth being part of the last stanza of the Bivouac of the Dead, written by Theodore O'Hara, who is also buried in Frankfort Cemetery.

Face:

East side:

Reverse:

West side:

Gallery

References

External links
 

Civil War Monuments of Kentucky MPS
National Register of Historic Places in Frankfort, Kentucky
United Daughters of the Confederacy monuments and memorials in Kentucky
Outdoor sculptures in Kentucky
1892 sculptures
Marble sculptures in Kentucky
1892 establishments in Kentucky
Statues in Kentucky